The Beaverhead impact structure is the 2nd largest impact structure within the U.S. It lies within the states of Idaho and Montana.

With an estimated age of 600 million years (Neoproterozoic), the impact's original shatter cones along the impact structure's perimeter provide some of the structure's only remaining visible evidence.

It is named for the Beaverhead region of southwestern Montana in which it was first discovered.

See also 

 Chesapeake Bay impact crater
List of impact craters in North America

References

Further reading 
 Carr, J and Link, PK, 1999, Neoproterozoic conglomerate and breccia in the formation of Leaton Gulch, Grouse Peak, northern Lost River Range, Idaho: Relation to Beaverhead Impact Structure, in Hughes, S.S., and Thackray, G.D., eds., Guidebook to the Geology of Eastern Idaho: Pocatello, Idaho Museum of natural History, p. 21-29.
 Aerial Exploration of the Beaverhead crater

Proterozoic impact craters
Impact craters of the United States
Landforms of Idaho
Landforms of Beaverhead County, Montana